The 1945 Kensington South by-election was held on 20 November 1945.  The byelection was held due to the elevation to hereditary peerage of the incumbent Conservative MP, Sir William Davison.  It was won by the Conservative candidate Richard Law.

References

Kensington South by-election
Kensington South,1945
Kensington South by-election
Kensington South by-election
Kensington South,1945
20th century in the Royal Borough of Kensington and Chelsea